USS Marblehead (CL-12) was an  light cruiser, originally classified as a scout cruiser, of the United States Navy. She was the third Navy ship named for the town of Marblehead, Massachusetts.

Built in Philadelphia, Pennsylvania
Marblehead was authorized on 1 July 1918, and assigned to William Cramp & Sons, Philadelphia on 24 January 1919. She was laid down on 4 August 1920, and launched on 9 October 1923, sponsored by Mrs. Joseph Evans. Marblehead was commissioned on 3 November 1923, with Captain Chauncey Shackford in command.

Her crew, during peace time, consisted of 29 officers and 429 enlisted men.

Marblehead was powered by four Parsons geared steam turbines, each driving one screw, using steam generated by 12 White-Forster boilers.

Marbleheads main armament went through many changes while she was being designed. Originally she was to mount ten /53 caliber guns; two on either side at the waist, with the remaining eight mounted in tiered casemates on either side of the fore and aft superstructures. After America's entry into World War I the US Navy worked alongside the Royal Navy and it was decided to mount four 6-in/53 caliber guns in two twin gun turrets fore and aft and keep the eight guns in the tiered casemates so that she would have an eight gun broadside and, due to limited arcs of fire from the casemate guns, four to six guns firing fore or aft. Her secondary armament consisted of two /50 caliber anti-aircraft guns in single mounts. Marblehead was initially built with the capacity to carry 224 mines, but these were removed early in her career to make way for more crew accommodations. She also carried two triple and two twin, above-water, torpedo tube mounts for  torpedoes. The triple mounts were fitted on either side of the upper deck, aft of the aircraft catapults, and the twin mounts were one deck lower on either side, covered by hatches in the side of the hull.

The ship lacked a full-length waterline armor belt. The deck over the machinery spaces and steering gear had a thickness of 1.5 inches. The gun turrets were not armored and only provided protection against muzzle blast. The conning tower had 1.5 inches of armor. Marblehead carried two floatplanes aboard that were stored on the two catapults. Initially these were probably Vought VE-9s until the early 1930s when the ship may have operated the OJ-2 until 1935 and Curtiss SOC Seagulls until 1940 when Vought OS2U Kingfishers were used on ships without hangars.

Armament changes
During her career Marblehead went through several armament changes, some of these changes were to save weight, but others were to increase her AA armament. The lower torpedo tube mounts proved to be very wet and were removed, and the openings plated over, before the start of World War II. Another change made before the war was to increase the 3-inch guns to eight; all were mounted in the ship's waist. After 1940, the lower aft  guns were removed and the casemates plated over for the same reason as the lower torpedo mounts. During the Battle of Makassar Strait, Marblehead had seven 3-inch/50-caliber guns and eight .50 caliber machine guns, four mounted atop the foremast and another four aft. The ship's anti-aircraft armament were augmented by three twin  Bofors guns along with twelve  Oerlikon cannons by the end of the war.

Inter-war period
After commissioning, Marblehead departed Boston for shakedown in the English Channel and Mediterranean. In 1925, she visited Australia, stopping en route in the Samoan and Society Islands and, on her return, in the Galápagos Islands. A year after her return, Marblehead was underway again on an extended voyage. Early in 1927, she cruised off Bluefields and Bragman's Bluffs, Nicaragua, her mission there to aid American efforts to bring together and reconcile the various political factions then fighting in that country. With one exception, Augusto César Sandino, faction leaders agreed to the terms of the Peace of Tipitapa on 4 May 1927, and the United States was requested to supervise elections in 1928.

Upon arrival there she contributed to the show of force aimed at the protection of American and other foreign nationals of Shanghai's international settlement during operations against that city through the summer of 1927, in China's civil war.

In addition to her stay at Shanghai, Marblehead spent two months up the Yangtze River at Hankow, and visited several Japanese ports before leaving the Far East in March 1928. En route home, the cruiser stopped at Corinto, Nicaragua to assist in the preparations for elections under the Peace of Tipitapa, delaying her return to Boston until August.

During the next decade Marblehead operated with both the Atlantic (August 1928-January 1933) and Pacific (February 1933-January 1938) Fleets. In January 1938, she was temporarily assigned to the Asiatic Fleet, receiving permanent assignment there seven months later. Home ported at Cavite, Philippine Islands, she cruised the Sea of Japan and the South and East China seas as tension, political and military, rapidly increased in the Far East.

World War II
"About on 24 November 1941," her war diary reported, "the Commander–in–Chief, US Asiatic Fleet sensed that the relations between the United States and Japan had reached such a critical state that movement of men–of–war...was indicated." The next day, Marblehead, with Task Force 5 (TF 5), departed Manila Bay for seemingly "routine weekly operations." She anchored at Tarakan, Borneo on 29 November, and waited for further instructions. On 8 December, (7 December in the United States) she received the message "Japan started hostilities; govern yourselves accordingly."

Battle of Makassar Strait, 1942

Marblehead and other American warships then joined with those of the Royal Netherlands Navy and the Royal Australian Navy to patrol the waters surrounding the Netherlands East Indies and to screen Allied shipping moving south from the Philippines. On the night of 24 January 1942, Marblehead covered the withdrawal of a force of Dutch and American warships after they had attacked, with devastating effect, an enemy convoy off Balikpapan. Six days later, in an attempt to repeat this success, the force departed Surabaja, Java, to intercept an enemy convoy concentration at Kendari. The Japanese convoy, however, sailed soon after, and the Allied force changed course, anchoring in Bunda Roads on 2 February. On 4 February, the ships steamed out of Bunda Roads and headed for another Japanese convoy sighted at the southern entrance to the Makassar Straits. At 09:49, 36 enemy bombers were sighted closing in on the formation from the east.

In the ensuing Battle of Makassar Strait, Marblehead successfully maneuvered through three attacks. After the third, an enemy plane spiraled toward the cruiser, but her gunners shot it down. The next minute a fourth wave of seven bombers released bombs at Marblehead. Two were direct hits and a third a near miss close aboard the port bow causing severe underwater damage. Fires swept the ship as she listed to starboard and began to settle by the bow. Her rudder jammed, Marblehead, continuing to steam at full speed, circled to port. Her gunners kept firing, while damage control crews fought the fires and helped the wounded. By 1100, the fires were under control. Before noon the enemy planes departed, leaving the damaged cruiser with 15 dead or mortally wounded and 84 seriously injured.

Marbleheads engineers soon released the rudder angle to 9° left, and at 12:55, she retired to Tjilatjap, steering by working the engines at varying speeds. Unable to be docked there, her worst leaks were repaired and she put to sea again on 13 February. Some of her wounded crew were taken off the ship to be cared for by Dr Corydon M. Wassell; he received the Navy Cross for protecting them from capture by the invading Japanese.

Still steering with her engines, she made Trincomalee, Ceylon on 21 February. Repairs could not be made there or anywhere in India for several weeks, so Marblehead departed for South Africa on 2 March. After touching at Durban and Port Elizabeth, Marblehead arrived at Simonstown on 24 March. There she underwent extensive repairs and on 15 April, sailed for New York.

Atlantic, Mediterranean, 1942-1944
On 15 October, the rebuilt Marblehead again put to sea. Attached to the South Atlantic Force, she operated against the enemy in the South Atlantic from Recife and Bahia, Brazil, until February 1944. Returning to New York on 20 February, she operated along the convoy lanes of the North Atlantic for the next five months. She then sailed for the Mediterranean. Arriving at Palermo on 29 July, she joined the task force then staging for Operation Dragoon, the invasion of southern France. From 15 to 17 August, the cruiser bombarded enemy installations in the vicinity of Saint Raphael, where Allied assault troops were landing. On 18 August, she withdrew to Corsica, her mission complete.

End of career
Marblehead returned to the United States, conducted a summer training cruise for Naval Academy midshipmen and then entered the Philadelphia Naval Shipyard, where she decommissioned on 1 November 1945. Her name was struck from the Naval Vessel Register on 28 November, and her hulk was scrapped on 27 February 1946.

Awards
  European–African–Middle Eastern Campaign Medal with one battle star for World War II service
  Asiatic-Pacific Campaign Medal with one battle star for World War II service

References

Further reading

External links

 Photo galleryat Naval Historical Center 
 

Omaha-class cruisers
World War II cruisers of the United States
Ships built by William Cramp & Sons
1923 ships
Marblehead, Massachusetts
Maritime incidents in February 1942